The Huangdi Sijing (lit. "Yellow Emperor's Four Classics") are long-lost Chinese manuscripts that were discovered among the Mawangdui Silk Texts in 1973. Also known as the Huang-Lao boshu (lit. "Huang-Lao Silk Texts"), they are thought by modern scholars to reflect a lost branch of early syncretist Daoism, referred to as the "Huang–Lao school of thought" named after the legendary Huangdi (黃帝 the "Yellow Emperor") and Laozi (老子 "Master Lao"). One finds in it "technical jargon" derived of Taoism, Legalism, Confucianism and Mohism.

The four texts

Mawangdui is an archeological site, comprising three Han-era tombs, found near Changsha in modern Hunan Province (ancient state of Chu). In December 1973, archeologists excavating "Tomb Number 3" (dated at 168 BCE) discovered an edifying trove of silk paintings and silk scrolls with manuscripts, charts, and maps. These polymathic texts discussed philosophy, politics, medicine, Daoist neigong, Yin and Yang, and astronomy. Most were unknown in the received literature, ranging from a formulary that modern editors entitled Recipes for Fifty-Two Illnesses and two texts on cauterization – the Zubi Shiyi Mai Jiujing and Yin Yang Shiyi Mai Jiujing, both precursors of the Huangdi Neijing – to the unknown Book of Silk, which lists three centuries of comet sightings.

The Mawangdui manuscripts included two silk copies of the Daodejing, eponymously titled "Laozi". Both add other texts and both reverse the received chapter arrangement, giving the Dejing chapters before the Daojing. The so-called "B Version" included four previously unknown works, each appended with a title and number of characters (字):
Jing Fa (經法 "The Constancy of Laws"), 5000 characters
Shi Da jing (十大經 "The Ten Great Classics"), 4564
Cheng (稱 "Aphorisms"), 1600
Dao Yuan (道原 "On Dao the Fundamental"), 464
Due to textual lacunae, that is gaps in the written text due to the fragmentary preservation of the original ancient silk manuscripts, the original character counts are also uncertain.

The two longest texts are subdivided into sections. "The Constancy of Laws" has nine: 1. Dao fa (道法 "The Dao and the Law"), 2. Guo ci (國次 "The Priorities of the State"), 3. Jun zheng (君正 "The Ruler's Government").... "The Sixteen Classics", which some scholars read as Shi da jing (十大經 "The Ten Great Classics"), has fifteen [sic]: 1. Li ming (立命 "Establishing the Mandate"), 2. Guan (觀 "Observation"), 3. Wu zheng (五正 "The Five Norms")....

In the decades since 1973, scholars have published many Mawangdui manuscript studies. In 1974, the Chinese journal Wenwu (文物 "Cultural objects/relics") presented a preliminary transcription into modern characters. Tang Lan's influential article gave photocopies with transcriptions, analyzed the textual origins and contents, and cited paralleling passages from Chinese classic texts. Tang was first to identify these texts as the "Huangdi sijing", a no-longer extant text attributed to the Yellow Emperor, which the Hanshu's Yiwenzhi (藝文志) bibliographical section lists as a Daoist text in four pian (篇 "sections"). The "Huangdi sijing" was lost and is only known by name, and thus the Daoist Canon excluded it. While most scholars agree with Tang's evidence, some disagree and call the texts the Huang-Lao boshu or the Huangdi shu (黃帝書 "The Yellow Emperor's books").

The first complete English translation of the Huangdi sijing was produced by Leo S. Chang (appended in Yu). Subsequent translations include scholarly versions by Yates and by Chang and Feng, as well as some selected versions. Ryden provides an informative examination of "The Yellow Emperor's Four Canons".

Philosophical significance 
The Huangdi sijing reveals some complex connections within Chinese philosophy. Take, for example, the first lines in "The Constancy of Laws":
The Way generates standards. Standards serve as marking cords to demarcate success and failure and are what clarify the crooked and the straight. Therefore, those who hold fast to the Way generate standards and do not to dare to violate them; having established standards, they do not dare to discard them. [Missing graph] Only after you are able to serve as your own marking cord, will you look at and know all-under-Heaven and not be deluded. (Dao fa, 1.1) 
This passage echoes concepts from several rival philosophies, Daoism, Legalism, Mohism, Confucianism, and School of Names. De Bary and Lufrano describe Huangdi sijing philosophy as "a syncretism that is grounded in a cosmology of the Way and an ethos of self-cultivation".

"Prior to the Mawangdui discovery," says Peerenboom , "sinologists were more confused than clear about the school of thought known as Huang-Lao". Sima Qian's Records of the Grand Historian says many early Han thinkers and politicians favored Huang-Lao doctrines during the reigns (202-157 BCE) of Emperor Wen, Emperor Jing, and Empress Dou. Sima cites Han Fei, Shen Buhai, and Shen Dao as representative Huang-Lao philosophers, advocates that sagely rulers should use wu wei to organize their government and society. However, after Emperor Wu of Han (r. 141-87 BCE) declared Confucianism the official state philosophy, Huang-Lao followers dwindled and their texts largely vanished.

The Huangdi sijing texts provide newfound answers to questions about how Chinese philosophy originated. Carrozza explains that, "For a long time, the focal point in the study of early Chinese thought has been the interpretation of a rather limited set of texts, each attributed to a 'Master' and to one of the so-called 'Hundred Schools'." For instance, tradition says Mozi founded Mohism and his students compiled the Mozi text. Conversely, Mawangdui textual syncretism reveals "the majority of the ancient texts" are not written by individual authors, "but rather collections of works of different origins."

References
 
 
  

Footnotes

External links
Huangdi sijing 黃帝四經 "The Four Classics of the Yellow Emperor", Ulrich Theobald
黃帝四經, Chinese text (Big5 encoding), University of Heidelberg

Chinese classic texts
Chinese philosophy
Philosophy books
Taoist texts